Horatio Brinsmade Munn  was an American professional baseball player who played second base for the 1875 Brooklyn Atlantics.

External links

Brooklyn Atlantics players
19th-century baseball players
Major League Baseball second basemen
Baseball players from Newark, New Jersey
1851 births
1910 deaths